The coat of arms of Liechtenstein is the coat of arms of the ruling Prince of Liechtenstein, currently Hans-Adam II. As the sovereign emblem of the Prince, its use is restricted to the Prince and members of his House, though private individuals are permitted to use the arms if it is in the interest of the State. The arms are a history of the House of Liechtenstein and show some of the different territories and families with which it has been connected, either by acquisition or by marriage.

Description
The base is occupied by the arms of the Duchy of Jägerndorf, while the arms of the Princely House itself are displayed on an inescutcheon.

The whole shield is surrounded by a purple (purpure) mantle with ermine lining, along with fringes and tassels of gold. At the top is placed the Princely hat.

The arms of the Princely House are sometimes used alone, and thus form the Lesser Arms of Liechtenstein. When shown alone, the arms are ensigned by the Princely hat.

See also
Flag of Liechtenstein

References

External links
 
 Coat of arms of Liechtenstein – Princely House of Liechtenstein
 Flag and coat of arms of Liechtenstein (archived on 28 July 2020)
 Gesetz vom 30. Juni 1982 über Wappen, Farben, Siegel und Embleme des Fürstentums Liechtenstein 

National symbols of Liechtenstein
Liechtenstein
Liechtenstein
Liechtenstein
Liechtenstein
Liechtenstein
Lichtenstein